Tsering Woeser (also written Öser; ; , Han name Chéng Wénsà 程文萨; born 1966) is a Tibetan writer, activist, blogger, poet and essayist.

Biography
Woeser, a quarter Han Chinese and three quarters Tibetan, was born in Lhasa. Her grandfather, Chinese, was an officer in the Nationalist Army of the Kuomintang and her father was a high rank Army officer in the People's Liberation Army. 
When she was very young, her family relocated to the Kham area of western Sichuan province. In 1988, she graduated from Southwest University for Nationalities in Chengdu with a degree in Chinese literature. She worked as a reporter in Kardzé and later in Lhasa and has lived in Beijing since 2003 as a result of political problems. Woeser is married to Wang Lixiong, a renowned author who frequently writes about Tibet. According to Reporters sans frontières, "Woeser is one of the few Tibetan authors and poets to write in Chinese." When the government refused to give her a passport, she sued the authorities.

Career

Woeser is the author of the book, Notes on Tibet. The Tibet Information Network quotes unnamed sources that the book was banned by the government around September 2003.

According to UNPO, shortly after the alleged ban, Woeser was also fired from her job and lost her status with her work unit. Radio Free Asia reported that she continued to post a variety of poems and articles to her two blogs: Maroon Map (oser.tibetcul.net), which, according to the author, was visited primarily by Tibetans and the Woeser blog (blog.daqi.com/weise), which was visited primarily by those of Han ethnicity. According to RFA, on July 28, 2006, both blogs were closed by order of the government, apparently in response to postings in which she expressed birthday greetings to the Dalai Lama and touched on other sensitive topics. Woeser stated that she would continue writing and speaking.

During the Tibetan unrest of 2008, Woeser and her husband were put under house arrest after speaking to reporters. In December 2008, Woeser and her husband were among the first of the original 303 signatories to Charter 08, now joined by thousands more. Liu Xiaobo, the author of Charter 08, was sentenced for eleven years of prison and awarded the 2010 Nobel Peace Prize. In July 2009, Woeser and her husband were one of more than 100 signatories to a petition asking Chinese authorities to release detained ethnic-Uyghur professor of economics Ilham Tohti. When she was honoured with the Prince Claus Awards in 2011, she was forbidden to receive the prize in the Dutch embassy.

Tsering Woeser defended Tibetan actions in the 1905 Tibetan Rebellion, saying that Zhao Erfeng invaded the region to  "brutally stop Tibetan protests", listing atrocities committed by Zhao.

Woeser's writings are regularly translated into English by the translations website High Peaks Pure Earth.

Awards
In 2007, Tsering Woeser was awarded the Norwegian Authors Union awards Freedom of Expression Prize.
In 2007, she was also awarded the freedom of speech medal by the Association of Tibetan Journalists.
In 2010, International Women's Media Foundation granted her with the Courage in Journalism Awards.
In 2011, Prince Claus Awards, theme Breaking taboos
In 2013, Tsering Woeser was awarded the International Women of Courage Award

Works
 Forbidden Memory Tibet during the Cultural Revolution
 ; Woeser's First poetry Edition
 .
 
 
 
 Tibet's True Heart. Selected Poems. Dobbs Ferry, NY, 2008 (Ragged Banner Press Excerpts), . Poems by Woeser (Weise), translated by A. E. Clark, Review 10−10−2008 (highpeakspureearth.com) Review 10−10−2008  (savetibet.org)
 Tibet on Fire: Self-Immolations Against Chinese Rule Verso, London (2016) 
 Forbidden Memory Tibet during the Cultural Revolution English edition, published 2020 by University of Nebraska Press, By Tsering Woeser, Photographs by Tsering Dorje, Edited by Robert Barnett, Translated by Susan T. Chen, Foreword by Wang Lixiong.

References

External links

"They Have Guns, and I, a Pen": Highly Valuable New Source on the Tibetan Rebellion
Woeser's blog
High Peaks Pure Earth, English translations of writings by Woeser
Introduction to Woeser, See "Secret Tibet" on this web page, from the website Tibet Writes
An Eye from History and Reality — Woeser and the Story of Tibet
An Analysis of the Woeser Incident  by Wang Lixiong
Article from Woeser  about the film Dreaming Lhasa
 Lone Tibetan Voice, Intent on Speaking Out 

1966 births
Living people
Tibetan poets
Tibetan journalists
Chinese women poets
Charter 08 signatories
Date of birth missing (living people)
Chinese bloggers
Chinese women bloggers
Tibetan human rights activists
Tibetan writers
People from Lhasa
Tibetan women poets
Tibetan women journalists
Southwest University for Nationalities alumni
Poets from Tibet
Recipients of the International Women of Courage Award
Buddhism and women
Tibetan Buddhists
Historians of the Cultural Revolution